Kim Do-heon (born 14 July 1982) is a South Korean former professional footballer.

Club career
Kim played for Suwon Samsung Bluewings and Seongnam Ilhwa Chunma before joining West Bromwich Albion. He led each team's K League title, and his technical abilities was likened to Paul Scholes in South Korea.

Kim spent a few days on trial at West Brom in December 2007, and could be loaned to the club from February with an option for a permanent switch at the end of the season. He scored his first goal for West Brom in the final match of the season against Queens Park Rangers, eight minutes after coming on as a second-half substitute. West Brom went on to win 2–0, securing them the Football League Championship title and promotion to the Premier League.

On 28 May, he completed the move to West Brom for £550,000. Kim made his Premier League debut on 16 August 2008 against Arsenal, where they lost the match 1–0. He scored once after the permanent move, in a 2–2 draw with Burnley in the FA Cup on 24 January 2009. After one and a half years in West Bromwich, he returned to South Korea.

Near the end of his playing career, he played for Malaysia Super League side Negeri Sembilan, and USL Championship side Indy Eleven.

International career
Kim played as a main playmaker for the national under-23 team in 2004 Summer Olympics, 2002 and 2006 Asian Games, whereas he was criticised for his unstable performance in senior team. It was his biggest desire to play in the FIFA World Cup, but he finally couldn't appear in a World Cup match. While he was a member of South Korea's squad for the 2006 FIFA World Cup, he had to watch his team's matches on the bench.

On 14 June 2008, Kim accomplished his first international hat-trick in a World Cup qualifier against Turkmenistan.

Personal life
Kim is married to Jung Hye-Won, who gave birth to their son on 12 August 2008. He delayed his return to Korea to visit his son for the first time, in order to participate in the opening games of the 2008–09 Premier League season.

Career statistics

Club

International

Honours
Suwon Samsung Bluewings
K League 1: 2004
Korean FA Cup: 2002, 2009
Korean League Cup: 2001, 2005
Korean Super Cup: 2005
Asian Club Championship: 2000–01, 2001–02
Asian Super Cup: 2001, 2002
A3 Champions Cup: 2005
Pan-Pacific Championship: 2009

Seongnam Ilhwa Chunma
K League 1: 2006
Korean League Cup runner-up: 2006

West Bromwich Albion
Football League Championship: 2007–08

South Korea U23
Asian Games bronze medal: 2002

South Korea
AFC Asian Cup third place: 2007
EAFF Championship: 2003

Individual
K League 1 Best XI: 2004, 2005, 2006, 2007
K League 1 Most Valuable Player: 2006
Korean FA Goal of the Year: 2006
K League Players' Player of the Year: 2007

References

External links

 
 National Team Player Record 
 
 Kim Do-heon – National Team stats at KFA 
 

1982 births
Living people
Association football midfielders
South Korean footballers
South Korean expatriate footballers
South Korea international footballers
Suwon Samsung Bluewings players
Negeri Sembilan FA players
Seongnam FC players
Korean Police FC (Semi-professional) players
South Korean expatriate sportspeople in England
West Bromwich Albion F.C. players
K League 1 Most Valuable Player Award winners
K League 1 players
English Football League players
Premier League players
Expatriate footballers in England
2006 FIFA World Cup players
2007 AFC Asian Cup players
Footballers at the 2004 Summer Olympics
Olympic footballers of South Korea
Sportspeople from Gyeonggi Province
South Korean expatriate sportspeople in the United Kingdom
Asian Games medalists in football
Footballers at the 2002 Asian Games
Footballers at the 2006 Asian Games
Asian Games bronze medalists for South Korea
Medalists at the 2002 Asian Games
Indy Eleven players
USL Championship players